The 1981–82 North Dakota Fighting Sioux men's ice hockey team represented the University of North Dakota in college ice hockey. In its fourth year under head coach John Gasparini, the team compiled a 35–12–0 record and reached the NCAA tournament for the ninth time. The Fighting Sioux defeated Wisconsin 5–2 to win the championship game at the Providence Civic Center in Providence, Rhode Island.

Season

Early season
In the summer of 1981 the WCHA suffered a tremendous upheaval. Two years after a proposal to divide the Conference into two divisions was rejected, the three Michigan schools along with Notre Dame left for the CCHA, a lesser but more geographically-centered conference. As a result, the WCHA was left with only 6 teams though those teams had combined to win 5 of the previous 6 national championships. The six teams scrambled to fill up their conference schedules against one another which resulted in several cases of unbalanced home/road games between WCHA members.

Regardless of their conference issues, North Dakota began the season on the road against Bowling Green, taking both games against the eventual CCHA champion. The following week UND hosted Northern Arizona, who were only in their second year of Division I play, and easily won both games with a combined score of 18–4. The Fighting Sioux ended their non-conference start with a pair of games against Providence and could only manage to split the weekend after a promising 6–0 win.

The Sioux's first loss of the year began an alternating cycle of wins and losses that lasted for over a month and plagues them through their early WCHA play. Even when the team headed to San Diego for a brief respite from the winter cold they couldn't shake the pattern and UND returned home with a 10–6 record but only 4–4 in conference. In mid-December North Dakota finally climbed out of their funk and won four consecutive games to close out the first part of their regular season.

Holiday Tournament
North Dakota headed to Troy to participate in the Rensselaer Holiday Tournament but with the team losing several members to the World Junior championship the Fighting Sioux couldn't stop St. Lawrence from posting 7 goals in the contest. UND salvaged the tournament with a win in the consolation game before barely squeaking by a down Boston University squad.

After returning home North Dakota returned to their conference schedule and won two tight games against Denver before splitting a road series at Colorado College. After capturing another home series UND headed to Wisconsin to take on the defending national champions as well as their biggest competition for the WCHA regular season title. At this point in the season Wisconsin was comfortably in the lead with a 14–1–1 conference record but UND had the ability to close the 7-point gap. The Fighting Sioux shut out Wisconsin in the first game but the Badgers came storming back to turn the tables on North Dakota and the two teams drew even after the weekend.

With UND needing a minor miracle to catch up to Wisconsin they played the two worst teams in the WCHA over a two-week span and won all four games. Fortunately, UND got the help they needed when Wisconsin split consecutive weekends (at home no less) and arrived in North Dakota with only a 3-point lead in the standings. The Fighting Sioux took full advantage and swept the weekend to put themselves atop the WCHA for the first time all season. With only one weekend remaining in the regular UND only needed to hold serve with Wisconsin but luck stayed on their side when the Badgers lost an 8–9 contest to Minnesota–Duluth. North Dakota won their first game against Denver and won the WCHA title, earning the first Broadmoor Trophy which replaced the MacNaughton Cup that Michigan Tech kept when they left the conference.

WCHA tournament
With only six teams left in the conference the WCHA decided to include all members in the postseason tournament with the top two seeds receiving byes to the semifinal. As conference champion, North Dakota sat idle for a weekend before welcoming Denver to Grand Forks. After a close win in game 1 UND captured the series with a 3-goal win to put them in the first WCHA championship series in 5 years. The only team standing in their way was Wisconsin who were looking for revenge after being passed for the conference title. In the first game North Dakota suffered their worst lost in six years, losing 0–9 at home. Because the championship was a two-game total-goal series UND still had another contest against Wisconsin but with a virtually insurmountable deficit UND was flat in the second match and lost to the Badgers once more.

NCAA tournament
Despite being embarrassed in the championship, North Dakota's season was not over and the 31 wins the team posted over the course of the season all but guaranteed UND with an at-large bit to the NCAA tournament. UND received the 2nd western seed and was able to host the Quarterfinal series against Clarkson. The Fighting Sioux defense showed up in full, holding the Golden Knights to a single goal in each game and advanced to the championship round in Providence.

In the semifinal North Dakota faced Northeastern who were making their first tournament appearance. After easily dispatching the Huskies, North Dakota faced Wisconsin for the seventh and final time. The two teams were evenly matched in the first period; Glen White opened the score less than 90 seconds in but the badgers responded less than three minutes later. The UND defense began to clamp down on UW in the second but that couldn't stop Wisconsin from again tying the game quickly. In the final period the Fighting Sioux threw caution to the wind and fired a barrage of 16 shots against Terry Kleisinger, finding the twine three times while Darren Jensen held the UND net. Team captain Phil Sykes was the story of the game, producing a hat trick along with an assist for North Dakota and allowing his team to win the national championship for the fourth time.

Awards and honors
Phil Sykes set an NCAA record for total points in championship games with 9 when his totals from the 1980 game are included (still the top mark as of 2019). Sykes received the tournament MOP for his performance and was joined on the All-Tournament team by Darren Jensen, James Patrick and Cary Eades. Despite North Dakota setting a new program record with 35 wins (since broken) no players were named to the AHCA All-American West Team, however, the WCHA recognized the team's accomplishments and UND swept the individual conference awards with Sykes winning Most Valuable Player, James Patrick capturing Freshman of the Year and John Gasparini receiving Coach of the Year. Furthermore, despite North Dakota rotating three goaltenders nearly equally throughout the season, Jon Casey was named to the All-WCHA First Team with Phil Sykes while James Patrick, Craig Ludwig and Troy Murray were named to the Second Team. Jon Casey also set a new team record for wins in a season with 15 (since UND began keeping individual goaltending records in 1973).

Standings

Schedule

|-
!colspan=12 style=";" | Regular Season

|-
!colspan=12 style=";" | 

|-
!colspan=12 style=";" | 

|- align="center" bgcolor="#e0e0e0"
|colspan=12|North Dakota Wins Series 9–5

|- align="center" bgcolor="#e0e0e0"
|colspan=12|North Dakota Loses Series 1–12
|-
!colspan=12 style=";" | 

|- align="center" bgcolor="#e0e0e0"
|colspan=12|North Dakota Wins Series 7–2

Roster and scoring statistics

Goaltending statistics

1982 championship game

(W1) Wisconsin vs. (W2) North Dakota

Players drafted into the NHL

1982 NHL Entry Draft

† incoming freshman

See also
1982 NCAA Division I Men's Ice Hockey Tournament
List of NCAA Division I Men's Ice Hockey Tournament champions

References

North Dakota Fighting Hawks men's ice hockey seasons
North Dakota
North Dakota
North Dakota
North Dakota
North Dakota
North Dakota